La Paz is a municipality in the State of Mexico, Mexico, with its municipal seat in the town of Los Reyes Acaquilpan. It is located on the dividing line between Mexico State and the eastern edge of the Federal District and is part of the Greater Mexico City area. The area was part of a region called "Atlicpac" which in Náhuatl means 'above or at the edge of water.'  The current city's/municipality's glyph symbolizes water.

History 
This area was the land of the Acolhuas whose capital was in Texcoco.  As such they were part of the heart of the Aztec Triple Alliance and the Aztec Empire, on the receiving end of tribute coming in from other parts of the empire. This continued until the Spanish conquest of the Aztec Empire. During the colonial period, more specifically in the 18th century, this area was in constant territorial conflict. This ended up with the consolidation of a number of communities into two entities called "San Salvador Tecamachalco" and "La Magdalena Atlicpac" around 1770-1773, now the neighborhoods of Atenantitlan and Tejolote. In 1882, the first railroad connecting the area and Mexico City was built, beginning Los Reyes' close economic ties with the metropolis even though the original town itself would not join the municipality until 1889.  Los Reyes achieved city status in 1977.  There is a tire burning festival held on the last Friday of every month.  The tire that emits the most smoke wins.  The current champion is Jesus Garcia from the surrounding municipality.  Opponents of global warming criticize this traditional festival as destructive to the environment.

The municipality was founded in 1875 by President Sebastián Lerdo de Tejada, furthering a process of consolidation of the area that had begun in the prior century. The towns of La Magdalena Atlicpac, San Sebastián Chimalpa and Tecamachalco were unified under the control of La Magdalena Atlicpac. Only later would Los Reyes become the seat.

Demographics
It borders with Chicoloapan, Chimalhuacán, Ixtapaluca, Valle de Chalco Solidaridad, Nezahualcoyotl and the Distrito Federal, specifically with the borough of Iztapalapa

The municipality consists of 18 localities (15 urban and 3 rural), of which its municipal seat, Los Reyes Acaquilpan, also known as Los Reyes La Paz, which had a 2010 census population of 85,359 inhabitants, is the largest. Line A of the Mexico City Metro terminates in Los Reyes at the station called Metro La Paz.

Towns and villages
Localities (cities, towns, and villages) are:

Gallery

References

Link to tables of population data from Census of 2005 INEGI: Instituto Nacional de Estadística, Geografía e Informática

External links
Los Reyes La Paz (Enciclopedia de los municipios de México)
Official Site, Los Reyes La Paz

 
Mexico City metropolitan area